This is a timeline of the Five Dynasties and Ten Kingdoms (907–979), which followed the collapse of the Tang dynasty in 907 AD. The Five Dynasties refer to the succession of dynasties which ruled northern China following the Tang collapse while the Ten Kingdoms, with the exception of Northern Han, ruled in southern China. This era of division ended in 979 AD with the rise of the Song dynasty under Emperor Taizu of Song, although the Song would never reconquer the northern territory lost to the Khitans, collectively known as the Sixteen Prefectures.

900s

910s

920s

930s

940s

950s

960s

970s

Gallery

References

Bibliography
 .

 (alk. paper)

 

  (paperback).
 

 
 .

 .

 

 
 

 
 
 
 
 
 
 
 
 

 
 .
 

 
 

 

 
  
 

 
 

Timelines of Chinese eras and periods